A blast beat is a type of drum beat that originated in hardcore punk and grindcore, and is often associated with certain styles of extreme metal, namely black metal and death metal, and occasionally in metalcore. In Adam MacGregor's definition, "the blast-beat generally comprises a repeated, sixteenth-note figure played at a very fast tempo, and divided uniformly among the bass drum, snare, and ride, crash, or hi-hat cymbal." Blast beats have been described by PopMatters contributor Whitney Strub as, "maniacal percussive explosions, less about rhythm per se than sheer sonic violence".

Napalm Death is said to have coined the term, though this style of drumming had been used by others for its characteristically chaotic sound.

History
The English band Napalm Death coined the term "blast beat", though this style of drumming had previously been practiced by others. Daniel Ekeroth argues that the blast beat was first performed by the Swedish group Asocial on their 1982 demo. D.R.I. (1983, "No Sense"), Sepultura (1985, track 11, "Antichrist"), S.O.D. (1985, track 11, "Milk"), Sarcófago (1986, track 10, "Satanas"), and Repulsion also included the technique prior to Napalm Death's emergence. Rockdetector contributor Garry Sharpe-Young credits D.R.I.'s Eric Brecht as the first on their 1983 debut but credits Napalm Death with making it better known. AllMusic contributor Thom Jurek credits jazz drummer Tony Williams as the "true inventor of the blastbeat" in 1979. 

There are instances of drummers incorporating blast beat patterns prior to the 1970s.  Drummer Bill Ward of Black Sabbath can be seen playing a brief blast beat in a 1970 performance of "War Pigs."  Additionally, drummer Carl Palmer of the progressive rock super-group Emerson, Lake & Palmer briefly used a blast beat in the band's 1970 instrumental "The Barbarian". King Crimson's "The Devil's Triangle" from their 1970 album In the Wake of Poseidon also features an early example of proto-blastbeats in the later half of the song. However, the blast beat as it is known today originated in the European hardcore and grindcore scenes in the 1980s. Contrary to popular belief, blast beats originated from punk and hardcore music, not metal music. In the UK punk and hardcore scene of the early 1980s there were many bands attempting to play as fast as possible. In 1985 emerging grindcore band Napalm Death replaced their former drummer Miles "Rat" Ratledge with Mick Harris, who brought to the band a whole new level of speed. Harris is credited with developing the term "blast beat", describing the fast notes played on the kick and snare. Harris started using the blast beat as a fundamental aspect of Napalm Death's early musical compositions. It was finally with Napalm Death's first full-length album Scum (1987) that blast beat started to evolve into a distinct musical expression of its own. Blast beats became popular in extreme music from the mid to late 1980s . The blast beat evolved into its modern form as it was developed in the American death metal and grindcore scene of the late 1980s and early 1990s. Pete Sandoval, drummer of Terrorizer (1986–1989) and later Morbid Angel (1984–2013), purportedly was the first to use blast beats in metronomic time (and not as arhythmic or non-metric white noise) and thus gave it a more useful musical characteristic for timekeeping.

Blast beats eventually appeared in commercially successful metal music, beginning with Fear Factory's album Demanufacture (1995) and Slipknot's album Iowa (2001).

Characteristics

A blast beat is traditionally played as an alternating single-stroke roll broken up between the kick drum and the snare drum. Blast beats are counted in 32nd or 16th notes. In a modern musical context blast beats are usually regarded as such when played at a minimum of above 90 beats per minute 32nd notes, or 180 bpm 16th notes. Early blast beats were generally quite slow and less precise compared to today's standards. Nowadays, a blast beat is normally played from 180 bpm 16th notes up to such high tempos as in the range of 250-280 bpm 16th notes (or even higher). There is also the "gravity blast", not to be confused with the one-handed gravity roll (see below). This technique uses the rim of the snare drum as a fulcrum, allowing two snare hits with one downward motion (essentially doing the work of two hands with only one).

Typical blast beats consist of 8th-note patterns between both the bass and snare drum alternately, with the hi-hat or the ride synced. Variations exist such as displacing hi-hat/ride, snare and bass drum hits and/or using other cymbals such as splashes, crashes, chinas and even tambourines for accenting, for example when using odd time or playing progressively. While playing 8th or 8th note triplets some drummers choose to play in sync with one foot while others split the 8th notes between both feet. In blast beats in general, the notes on the kick drum can be played either with one foot only or by alternating both feet, referred to as a "two-foot" or "economy" blast.

Variations
As blast beats have evolved, different types and interpretations have emerged. There are four main variations of the blast beat: the traditional blast, the bomb blast, the hammer blast and the freehand blast.

The traditional blast beat is a single-stroke roll alternating between the snare drum and kick drum. The ride hand is usually playing in unison with the kick drum. The traditional blast beat is structurally very similar to the skank beat, which can be regarded as a predecessor and a half time variation of the traditional blast beat. The skank beat originated in the early punk and thrash metal scene as a drum beat for extreme music. The skank beat is similar to the blast beat as it alternates between the kick and the snare, with the difference that the ride hand plays notes in unison with both kick and snare. A skank beat is in other words a sped up 2/4 rock or polka beat. In the US the skank beat was early on also referred to as the "Slayer" or "thrash" beat due to its popularity among thrash metal bands such as Slayer.

The bomb blast is essentially a combination of blast beat and double bass drumming. When measured in 16th notes a bomb blast consists of 8th notes on the snare played above a 16th notes kick drum line. Most drummers play this beat by leading with the snare, while the traditional blast beat is usually led with the kick. The bomb blast became popular among 1990s death metal bands such as Cannibal Corpse, which is why the bomb blast is also referred to as the "Cannibal" blast.

The hammer blast is played with the kick and snare in unison. Instead of playing 8th notes kick and snare in alternation and thus creating a 16th notes roll, the hammer blast is played as a straight 8th notes roll on the kick and snare simultaneously. The advantage of the hammer blast is that only one fast hand is needed, which usually is the drummer's leading hand (right for right-handed and left for left-handed). If the weaker hand can't keep up with the 8th notes snare line, it can play quarter notes. The kick drum line can be played with one foot as well as a two-footed economy blast. When played at an extremely fast tempo, the hammer blast can be referred to as a "hyper blast". The hammer blast became popular in death metal music of the early 1990s.

The freehand blast, also known as the gravity blast, utilizes the gravity roll technique in a blast beat context. Of all the main blast beat variations, this one is the most recent to have emerged. The snare line is played as a 16th notes single stroke roll, also known as a gravity roll or single handed roll. The roll is played with an up and down motion in which you push and pull the drumstick on and off the snare drum. By using the snare rim as a fulcrum you create a stroke each time you push and pull the drumstick up and down. In this way, the player can double the output of notes to match the amount of notes produced by two feet on the bass drum. It usually presents similarly to a unison hammer blast, but at double the tempo of what would be possible with normal techniques. One drawback is that this blast has a limited volume. The concept behind the gravity roll is not new, but is noted for being brought into modern music by drummer Johhny Rabb. Rabb has published the book The Official Freehand Technique, which covers the gravity roll technique. The term "gravity roll" or "gravity blast," while common and accepted usage, is less correct than "freehand roll" or "fulcrum roll" in that the technique does not rely on gravity and can be played sideways, inverted, or in a zero gravity environment. A combination of the gravity blast and the bomb blast (i.e. both the kick and the snare is playing 16th notes in unison) is called a gravity bomb.

Examples
Examples of the four main blast beat variations in drum tab:

  C- x-x-x-x-x-x-x-x-|   C- x-x-x-x-x-x-x-x-|   C- x-x-x-x-x-x-x-x-|   C- x-x-x-x-x-x-x-x-|
  S- o-o-o-o-o-o-o-o-|   S- -o-o-o-o-o-o-o-o|   S- o-o-o-o-o-o-o-o-|   S- oooooooooooooooo|
  B- o-o-o-o-o-o-o-o-|   B- o-o-o-o-o-o-o-o-|   B- oooooooooooooooo|   B- o-o-o-o-o-o-o-o-|

The first example is a hammer blast. The second example shows a traditional blast beat - essentially a skank beat played at a high tempo (this particular one leads with the bass drum, but the snare can lead as well). Example #3 shows a blast beat with double bass, known as a bomb blast. Example #4 illustrates a freehand blast, also known as a gravity blast and is the only one that showcases the proper speed of a modern blast beat.

See also
Freehand roll

References

External links
 Flo Mounier's Extreme Metal DVD
 Johnny Rabb's Home Page

Drum rudiments
Drum patterns
Percussion performance techniques
Heavy metal performance techniques
Rhythm and meter